Baltazar Kasirivu-Atwooki, also Kasirivu-Atwooki Kyamanywa, is a Ugandan politician. He is the current State Minister for Economic Monitoring in the Cabinet of Uganda. He was appointed to that position on 6 June 2016, replacing Henry Banyenzaki, who was dropped from the cabinet. He also concurrently serves as the elected Member of Parliament for Bugangaizi County West, in Kibaale District, since 2011.

Background and education
He  was born in Kibaale District on 5 January 1958. He holds a Master of Science in Agricultural Extension, obtained in 1997 from Makerere University.

Career
From 1984 until 1992, he served as a Veterinary Officer. He then served as a District Veterinary Officer from 1992 until 1996. He joined the Ugandan parliament in 1996, and has been a member since. From 2006 until 2009, he served as State Minister for Lands and as Senior Presidential Adviser on Land Matters from 2009 until 2011. On 6 June 2016, he was appointed State Minister for Economic Monitoring.

Personal
Baltazar Kasirivu-Atwooki is married.

See also
 Parliament of Uganda
 Cabinet of Uganda
 Kibaale District

References

External links
Website of the Parliament of Uganda

Living people
1958 births
Kibaale District
People from Kibaale District
Makerere University alumni
Members of the Parliament of Uganda
Government ministers of Uganda
National Resistance Movement politicians
People from Western Region, Uganda